Leović is a village in Serbia. It is situated in the Ljubovija municipality, in the Mačva District of Central Serbia. The village had a Serb ethnic majority and a population of 318 in 2002.

Historical population

1948: 921
1953: 953
1961: 993
1971: 801
1981: 623
1991: 486
2002: 318

References

See also
List of places in Serbia

Populated places in Mačva District
Ljubovija